Centenario is a small town in the north of Durazno Department of central Uruguay.

Geography
The town is located on Route 5, just across Río Negro from Paso de los Toros of Tacuarembó Department.

Population
In 2011 it had a population of 1,136.
 
Source: Instituto Nacional de Estadística de Uruguay

References

External links
INE map of Centenario

Populated places in the Durazno Department